La Maison de la Fléche is a 1930 French mystery film directed by Henri Fescourt, starring Alice Field, Léon Mathot and Gaston Dupray. The film was based on the 1924 novel The House of the Arrow by A.E.W. Mason, and was made at Twickenham Studios in London as part of a co-production that saw an English-language version directed by Leslie S. Hiscott.

Cast
 Annabella - Betty Harlowe 
 Alice Field - Ann Upcott 
 Léon Mathot - Langeac 
 Gaston Dupray - Jim Frobisher 
 Jeanne Brindeau - Miss Harlowe 
 Henri Desfontaines - Bex 
 Nadia Debory - Francine Juliard 
 Marcel de Garcin - Thévenet 
 Robert Casa - Girardot 
 Max Maxudian - Boris Waberski

External links

1930 films
British mystery films
1930 mystery films
1930s French-language films
Films directed by Henri Fescourt
Films based on British novels
Films based on mystery novels
French multilingual films
French black-and-white films
French mystery films
1930 multilingual films
1930s British films
1930s French films